The Ashcroft First Nation is a First Nations government Thompson Canyon area of the Central Interior of the Canadian province of British Columbia.  Its Indian Reserves are located near the town of Ashcroft, British Columbia, it is a member of the Nlaka'pamux Nation Tribal Council.

Other Nlaka'pamux bands belong to the Nicola Tribal Association or the Fraser Canyon Indian Administration.

Indian Reserves 

Indian Reserves under the administration of the Ashcroft First Nation are:
105 Mile Post Indian Reserve No. 2, along the right (N) bank of the Thompson River, west of the town of Ashcroft, 1365.60 ha. 
Ashcroft Indian Reserve No. 4, south of and adjoining 105 Mile Post IR 2, 123.30 ha. 
Cheetsum's Farm Indian Reserve No. 1, on right (N) bank of the Thompson River at mouth of Cheetsum Creek, 298.90 ha. 
McLean's Lake Indian Reserve No. 3, on McLean Lake, 7 miles NW of the town of Ashcroft, 198.30 ha.

See also 

 Thompson language
 Nl'akapxm Eagle Motorplex

References 
Indian and Northern Affairs Canada – First Nation Detail

Nlaka'pamux governments
Thompson Country